This is a list of the number-one hit albums and singles in 1973 in Denmark. The charts were produced by the IFPI Danmark and were published in the newspaper Ekstra Bladet as well as broadcast on Danmarks Radio. From May 1973, album sales were mixed with those for single to create a combined chart. This was due to the decline of the singles market compared to the growing popularity of albums.

References

1973 in Denmark
Denmark
Lists of number-one songs in Denmark